Events of the year '''2022 in Pakistan.

Incumbents

National government

Provincial governments

Events

January 
 8 January – 2022 Murree snowstorm kills 23 domestic tourists.
 20 January – 2022 Lahore bombing near Anarkali Bazaar kills at least 3 people and injures 20+.
 20-23 January - 2022 Pakistan landslides
 25 January – 2022 Kech District attack
 26 January – 2022 Karachi protests
 27 January – 27 February: 2022 Pakistan Super League commences with Karachi Kings v Multan Sultans.

February 
 2 February
 Lumpy skin disease outbreak in Karachi
 2022 Panjgur and Naushki raids
 4 February – Pakistan at the 2022 Winter Olympics
 12 February – Lynching of Mushtaq Ahmed
 27 February
 Huqooq-e-Sindh March
 PPP long march

March
 1 March – 2022 heat wave in India and Pakistan
 2 March
 2021–22 Pakistan Cup
 March 2022 Quetta bombing
 3 March – 2022 Sibi suicide bombing
 4 March
 Australian cricket team in Pakistan in 2021–22
 2022 Peshawar mosque attack
 8 March – No-confidence motion against Imran Khan
 9 March – Mian Channu incident
 10 March – Parliament Lodges operation
 11 March – 14 March: Pashtun National Jirga
 15 March – 2022 Sibi IED explosion
 18 March – Protesters storming Sindh House
 22 March – 23 March: 48th Foreign Ministers conference
 27 March – Imran Khan rally in Islamabad
 29 March – 2022 MONUSCO helicopter crash 6 Pakistani UN Peacekeeping soldiers killed in Democratic Republic of Congo

April 
 3 April – 2022 Pakistani constitutional crisis
 10 April – Imran Khan is removed from the post of Prime Minister of Pakistan through a no-confidence motion, adopted by the majority of the parliament. 
 11 April – Shehbaz Sharif is sworn-in as the Prime Minister of Pakistan.
 18 April – Dadu village fire
 26 April – 2022 University of Karachi bombing

May 
 13 May – 2022 Cholistan water crisis
 16 May – 2022 Haripur wildfire
 18 May – Sherani District wildfire
 19 May – 2022 Pakistan economic crisis
 24 May – Sri Lanka women's cricket team in Pakistan in 2022
 25 May – 2022 Azadi march
 29 May – 2022 Balochistan local government elections

June 
 1 June – Federal Shariah Court verdict on interest system in Pakistan
 4 June – Shangla District wildfire
 8 June
 West Indian cricket team in Pakistan in 2022
 Killa Saifullah bus crash
 10 June – 2022-2023 Pakistan federal budget
 12 June – 2022 Karachi fire
 14 June – October - 2022 Pakistan floods
 17 June – Pakistan at the 2022 World Aquatics Championships
 21 June – June 2022 Afghanistan earthquake
 26 June – 2022 Sindh local government elections

July 
 7 July – Pakistan at the 2022 World Games
 15 July – Pakistan at the 2022 World Athletics Championships
 17 July – 2022 Punjab provincial by-election
 18 July – Sadiqabad boat sinking
 28 July – Pakistan at the 2022 Commonwealth Games

August 
 1 August – 
 2022 Pakistan Army helicopter incident
 The 2022 Census of Pakistan
 2 August – The Election Commission of Pakistan announced verdict of PTI foreign funding case.
 9 August – Pakistan at the 2021 Islamic Solidarity Games
 13 August – 2022 Kashmir Premier League
 14 August
 Celebrations of Pakistan platinum (75th) Independence Day.
 2021–22 Pakistan Premier League
 16 August – M-5 motorway bus-oil tanker collision
 28 August – 
 Pakistan at the 2022 Asia Cup
 2022 Karachi local elections
 30 August – 2022–23 National T20 Cup

September 
 13 September – 2022 Swat blast
 20 September – English cricket team in Pakistan in 2022–23
 24 September – Pakistani audio leaks controversy
 27 September – 2022–23 Quaid-e-Azam Trophy

October 
 6 October – 2022 Pakistan Junior League
 9 October – The Centaurus mall fire
 10 October – 2022 Swat school van attack
 13 October – Abandoned bodies incident in Nishtar Hospital
 14 October – Pakistan won the New Zealand Tri-Nation Series.
 16 October – 2022 Pakistan by-elections
 28 October – 2022 Azadi March-II
 28 October – Machar colony incident

November 
 3 November - Attempted assassination of Imran Khan
 4 November - Ireland women's cricket team in Pakistan in 2022–23
 6 November - 2022 Ghotki attack
 16 November - 2022 Lakki Marwat attack
 27 November - 2022 AJK local government elections
 30 November - November 2022 Quetta bombing

December 
 10 December - 2022–23 Pakistan Cup
 23 December - 2022 Islamabad suicide attack
 26 December - New Zealand cricket team in Pakistan in 2022–23 (December 2022)
 31 December - 2022 Islamabad local government elections

Arts

Cinema

Television 
 2022 in Pakistani television

Economy 
 2021–22 Pakistan federal budget
 2022–23 Pakistan federal budget

Deaths

January-March 
17 January - Rasheed Naz, television actor (b. 1948)
18 February - Athar Mateen, producer of Samaa TV
23 February - Rehman Malik, politician
27 February - Mahmood Ashraf Usmani, Islamic scholar, jurist and an author

April-June 
 15 April - Bilquis Edhi
7 May - Sardar Ali Haqqani, Islamic scholar
9 June - Aamir Liaquat Hussain, politician

July-September 
13 July - Tanveer Jamal
20 August - Nayyara Noor, playback singer
29 August - Manzoor Hussain (field hockey)

October-December 
23 October - Arshad Sharif, journalist

See also

Country overviews
 Pakistan
 Economy of Pakistan
 Government of Pakistan
 History of Pakistan
 History of modern Pakistan
 Outline of Pakistan
 Politics of Pakistan
 Terrorist incidents in Pakistan in 2022
 Years in Pakistan

Related timelines for current period
 2022
 2022 in politics and government
 2020s
 21st century

References 

 
Pakistan
Pakistan
2020s in Pakistan
Years of the 21st century in Pakistan